The Jamaat Ahle Sunnat is a Muslim religious organization in Pakistan that represents the Barelvi movement. It was supported by Muhammad Shafee Okarvi. As a Sunni organisation it has adopted many Sufi customs and traditions.

History
In the 20th century, Barelvi movement spread beyond India to other parts of South Asia and the Muslim world, and it became known as Ahl e sunnat wal jamat. The movement has also been associated with political movements in Pakistan, particularly the Jamiat Ulma-e-Pakistan party, which has advocated for the rights of Muslims in the country.

The organization emphasized the importance of following the Sunnah and the teachings of the four orthodox schools of Shariah. They also placed great importance on the venration of the prophet Muhammad and the Sufi saints.

In 2006, a bomb attack on a Jamaat Ahle Sunnat organised event to celebrate the mawlid (birthday of the Islamic prophet Muhammad) in Karachi killed at least 63 people and injured over 80. Among the dead were several Barelvi religious figures, including the senior leadership of Jamaat Ahle Sunnat and Sunni Tehreek. Three men said to belong to the Lashkar-e-Jhangvi were indicted for the crime.

In 2011, scholars from the organization advised Muslims not to attend the funeral of Salmaan Taseer, the Punjab governor who had recently been assassinated in response to his outspoken beliefs against blasphemy laws.

References

External links

Ahlus Sunnah Wal Jamaah

Barelvi organizations
Islam in Pakistan
Sunni organizations
Islamic organisations based in Pakistan